Cho Myain Thaw Let Sar Chay Chin is a 2017 Burmese drama film, directed by Mee Pwar starring Sai Sai Kham Leng, Shwe Hmone Yati and Khin Wint Wah. The film, produced by Shwe Si Taw Film Production premiered Myanmar on May 19, 2017.

Cast
Sai Sai Kham Leng as Min Nyo
Shwe Hmone Yati as Eant Htar May
Khin Wint Wah as Candy, Hnin Nu Hnin Si
Han Lin Thant
Mone

References

2017 films
2010s Burmese-language films
Burmese drama films
Films shot in Myanmar